Oebisfelde-Calvörde was a Verwaltungsgemeinschaft ("collective municipality") in the Börde district, in Saxony-Anhalt, Germany. It was situated east of Wolfsburg. The seat of the Verwaltungsgemeinschaft was in Oebisfelde. It was disbanded on 1 January 2010.

The Verwaltungsgemeinschaft Oebisfelde-Calvörde consisted of the following municipalities (population in 2006 between brackets):

References

Former Verwaltungsgemeinschaften in Saxony-Anhalt